Zachariah Winston Kerr (born August 29, 1990) is an American football defensive end who is currently a free agent. He played college football at Delaware, and signed with the Indianapolis Colts as an undrafted free agent in 2014. He also played for the Denver Broncos, Carolina Panthers, San Francisco 49ers, and Arizona Cardinals.

Professional career

Indianapolis Colts
Kerr went undrafted in 2014, and signed with the Indianapolis Colts as an undrafted free agent. He played in all four pre-season games that year, recording 14 tackles and 1 sack. Kerr made his regular season debut in Week 1 against the Denver Broncos, recording 1 tackle. During his rookie season in 2014, Kerr played 12 games with 16 tackles, 1 pass defended, and 3 sacks. In 2015, he played 12 games with 29 tackles. In 2016, he played 12 games with 19 tackles, 2.5 sacks, and a fumble recovery.

Denver Broncos
On March 11, 2017, Kerr signed a two-year deal with the Denver Broncos. In 11 games of 2017, Kerr finished the year with 19 tackles, half a sack, and one pass defended.

In 2018, Kerr played in all 16 games, recording 33 combined tackles and 1.5 sacks.

On March 16, 2019, Kerr signed a two-year contract extension with the Broncos. He was released on August 26, 2019.

Arizona Cardinals
On October 2, 2019, Kerr signed with the Arizona Cardinals.

Carolina Panthers
Kerr signed a two-year contract with the Carolina Panthers on March 25, 2020. He was placed on the reserve/COVID-19 list by the team on December 7, 2020, and activated on December 22. He was released after the season on March 16, 2021.

San Francisco 49ers
Kerr signed a one-year contract with the San Francisco 49ers on March 23, 2021. He played in four games before being released on November 6, 2021.

Arizona Cardinals (second stint)
On November 9, 2021, Kerr signed with the Arizona Cardinals. He was waived on January 10, 2022 and re-signed to the practice squad.

Cincinnati Bengals
On January 19, 2022, the Cincinnati Bengals signed Kerr off the Cardinals practice squad.

References

External links
Denver Broncos bio
Indianapolis Colts bio
Delaware Fightin' Blue Hens football bio
Pro-Football Reference

1990 births
Living people
Sportspeople from Virginia Beach, Virginia
Players of American football from Virginia
American football defensive tackles
American football defensive ends
Delaware Fightin' Blue Hens football players
Indianapolis Colts players
Denver Broncos players
Arizona Cardinals players
Carolina Panthers players
San Francisco 49ers players
Cincinnati Bengals players